Golden Arm Trio is the performance and recording vehicle of Graham Reynolds, a composer, bandleader, and improviser. With the jazz-based Golden Arm Trio, Reynolds has toured the country and released four critically acclaimed albums, including Why the Sea is Salt and The Tick-Tock Club. Beyond a consistent presence in Austin, the annual workshop series at Dive Bar, and seventeen straight years at SXSW, their tours took them to clubs and venues throughout the country, including The Kennedy Center, The Knitting Factory, Chicago Arts Center, and Spaceland.

As the sole constant member in its twenty-year history, Reynolds serves as bandleader for this ever-evolving group. Utah Hamrick and Jeremy Bruch currently complete the trio, but past members of Golden Arm Trio include Erik “The Butcher” Grostic, Oliver Eclinara, Smokey Joe Miller, and Boaz Martin. As told by The Austin Chronicle, “Although the trio designation would lead you to believe otherwise, this forever fluctuating collective is really more of an expansive outlet for vanguard pianist/percussionist Graham Reynolds to explore a variety of musical tangents… Jazz is the closest genre you can tie this music to, yet the Trio’s sometimes discordant intensity leans more toward experimental fringe-dwellers like John Cage and Raymond Scott.”

References 

American jazz ensembles from Texas
Musical groups from Austin, Texas
Jazz musicians from Texas